Jargon Software Inc. is a computer software development company that specializes in development and deployment tools and business applications for mobile handheld devices such as Pocket PC and Symbol PDA devices.

The company is based in Minneapolis, Minnesota, United States, and is a privately held Minnesota corporation. It markets its products both directly and through selected resellers to corporate, governmental and other organizations around the world.

History
Jargon Software was formed in 1997 to create an Internet application architecture that would overcome the inherent limitations of traditional web-enabling technologies, not require long and complicated download and installation procedures, insulate the application from the turbulent times that lie ahead, and offer an upgrade path to emerging technologies. The company was originally named Viking Software Corp. The name was changed to Jargon Software in late 1998 in light-hearted recognition of the many buzzwords pertaining to the technology that underlies the company's products. The founders and principals of Jargon Software are Richard D. Rubenstein, Timothy J. Bloch, and Thomas L. Dietsche.

Products
Jargon Software products are used by developers to develop and deploy smart-client mobile software applications that can run both online and offline. Jargon Software designs mobile products that integrate sales-order processing, inventory, field service, and inspections for small and large companies in any industry anywhere in the world. The open Jargon design makes it possible to manage business on any PDA.

Industries where Jargon mobile software works especially well include motor vehicles & parts, furniture & home furnishings, building & construction materials, electronic equipment, appliances, garden equipment & supplies, foods & beverages, health & personal care, clothing & clothing accessories, sporting goods, real estate management, florists, office supplies, hardware, farm implements, jewelry, petroleum products, pets & pet supplies.

ForceField Mobile SFA
ForceField Mobile SFA (salesforce automation) is an extensible application that works like a remote control. It puts the power of the office into the hands of salespeople, letting them be with their customers rather than in the office. 

All data is stored on the mobile PDA while also being able to operate real-time when a connection is present. 

The development tool creates XML files that define the client-side user interface (UI), with embedded JavaScript for client-side logic. Developers create applications that directly manipulate individual client components via a server's responses to HTTP requests or via embedded JavaScript functions that are linked to UI events.

The deployment engine runs on various mobile devices, including handhelds, tablets, and laptop PCs. It interprets and executes XML applications that are downloaded from a host server (similar to reading web pages). 

Since these XML pages are hosted, deployment overhead is essentially eliminated when installing new versions of the applications. The user can get the latest version by simply clicking a button while online, the devices do not need to be brought back into the home office to be restaged.

Successful mobile applications must be able to run when disconnected from the network, due to coverage dead spots or restrictions on use of wireless devices in certain areas (e.g. medical facilities). This results in the need to store data locally on the mobile device. Jargon Reader can store low-volume data automatically in text and table components. Embedded SQL databases (such as the Oracle Lite Database from Oracle Corporation) are used for higher volume storage requirements. 

Client-host synchronization is achieved at the application level, resulting in more efficiency and eliminating the need for additional mobile middleware.

Jargon Writer
Jargon Writer is a platform-neutral and language-neutral development system that uses XML to construct a mobile application's graphical user interfaces with a robust yet lightweight set of components, an event handling framework, and locally executed procedures. A generic HTTP interface is used to run procedures on remote hosts via middleware products or built-in web server features such as Active Server Pages (ASP) or PHP scripts. The HTTP interface can also request text documents, images and other files from any server on the network to which the client is connected. 
FTP uploads and downloads are also supported.

Jargon Writer uses a point-and-click, drag-and-drop WYSIWYG layout editor with fill-in-the blanks attribute tables, and a text editor for writing JavaScript functions. It also includes PDA Emulator and Windows versions of the Jargon Reader deployment products so that developers can run applications as they are being developed to see how they look and behave.

Jargon Reader
Jargon Reader deployment products are a family of high-performance client engines that use a patented methodology to automatically download and execute the XML-based applications developed with Jargon Writer.

Using the information in these XML client application files, Jargon Reader renders (draws) the graphical user interface and executes logic functions in response to user interface events such as selecting a button. Various peripherals such as barcode readers, mag-card readers, RFID readers and mobile printers are also supported.

Versions of Jargon Reader have been written for the following client platforms:

 Jargon Reader for Pocket PC runs on WinCE and PocketPC-based handheld devices including HP, Dell and Symbol
 Jargon Reader for Windows runs on all 32-bit Windows PC platforms (Windows 95/98/ME/NT/2000/XP)

Patents
 , "System and method for deploying and implementing software applications over a distributed network", - 	Timothy J. Bloch, Thomas L. Dietsche, Richard D. Rubenstein - 2007

External links
Company homepage

Development software companies
Software companies established in 1997
Integrated development environments
Personal digital assistant software
Pocket PC software